Nadezhda Plamenova Panayotova (Bulgarian: Надежда Пламенова Панайотова; born 26 December 1979) is a Bulgarian actress, voice actress and singer best known for dubbing the voices of Elsa (in Frozen), Pepa (Encanto) and Rapunzel (in Tangled) in Bulgarian.

She holds a master's degree of Public Speech, and is a lecturer in Law at the National Theater Academy in Krastyo Sarafov and at MONTFIZ Schools.

References

Living people
1979 births
Bulgarian actresses
Bulgarian voice actresses
21st-century Bulgarian women singers
People from Shumen